Leonardo Antonio Gutiérrez Fantuzzi (born 24 September 1974) is a Chilean former professional footballer who played as a defender for clubs in Chile and Indonesia.

Career
In Chile, Gutiérrez played for Deportes Antofagasta and Deportes Concepción in the top division. 

At the end of 2002, he went to Indonesia and joined Persebaya Surabaya, staying with them until 2005. He also played for Persik Kediri and Persma Manado. 

He won the league titles in both 2003 (Divisi Satu, second division) and 2004 (Premier Division) with Persebaya Surabaya.

In 2009, he joined Deportes Copiapó, his last club, in the Primera B de Chile.

Honours
Persebaya Surabaya
 Divisi Satu: 2003
 Liga Indonesia Premier Division: 2004

References

External links
 
 

1974 births
Living people
Chilean people of Italian descent
Place of birth missing (living people)
Chilean footballers
Chilean expatriate footballers
C.D. Antofagasta footballers
Deportes Concepción (Chile) footballers
Persebaya Surabaya players
Persik Kediri players
Persma Manado players
Deportes Copiapó footballers
Chilean Primera División players
Primera B de Chile players
Indonesian Premier Division players
Chilean expatriate sportspeople in Indonesia
Expatriate footballers in Indonesia
Association football defenders